This article lists political parties in Sweden.

Sweden has a multi-party system with numerous political parties, in which no one party often has a chance of gaining power alone, and parties must work with each other to form coalition governments.

National parties

The letter(s) after each Swedish party name are the abbreviations commonly used in the Swedish media.

Parties with official representation
Parties with representation in the Riksdag and/or European Parliament:

According to a threshold rule, any one particular party must receive at least 4% of the votes to be allocated a seat in the Riksdag.
Any party having broken the 1% threshold in the last two EU-parliament or Riksdag elections respectively will have their ballots printed and distributed by the authorities.

Minor parties

Alternative for Sweden (Alternativ för Sverige; 2017–present)
Christian Values Party (Kristna Värdepartiet; 2014–present)
Citizens' Coalition (Medborgerlig Samling, 2014–present)
Classical Liberal Party (Klassiskt Liberala Partiet, 2004–present)
Climate Alliance (Klimatalliansen, 2021-present)
Communist Party (Kommunistiska Partiet; 1970–present)
Communist Party of Sweden (Sveriges Kommunistiska Parti; 1995–present)
Direct Democrats (Direktdemokaterna; 2014–present)
 (Animals' Party; 2014–present)
European Workers Party (Europeiska Arbetarpartiet; 1974–present)
Feminist Initiative (Feministiskt Initiativ; 2005–present) – Represented in the European Parliament 2014–2019.
Health Care Party (Sjukvårdspartiet; 2005–present)
Human Rights and Democracy (Mänskliga rättigheter och Demokrati, MoD; 2021-present)
Independent Rural Party (Landsbygdspartiet oberoende, 2010–present)
Nordic Resistance Movement (Nordiska Motståndsrörelsen; 1997–present)
Nuance Party (Partiet Nyans; 2020–present)
Pirate Party (Piratpartiet; 2006–present) – Represented in the European Parliament 2009–2014.
Socialist Justice Party (Rättvisepartiet Socialisterna; 1997–present)
Turning Point Party (Partiet vändpunkt; 2019–present)
Unity (Enhet; 1990–present)
Volt Sweden (Volt Sverige; 2018–present)

Defunct and historical parties 
Caps (Mössorna, 18th century)
Hats (Hattarna, 18th century)
Social Democratic Left Party of Sweden (Sveriges Socialdemokratiska Vänsterparti, 1921–1923)
Communist Party of Sweden – Höglund Faction (Sveriges Kommunistiska Parti, 1924–1926)
Socialist Party (Socialistiska Partiet, 1929–1945)
Clerical People's Party (Kyrkliga Folkpartiet, 1930s)
National Socialist Workers Party (Nationalsocialistiska Arbetarpartiet, 1933–1945)
Left Socialist Party (Vänstersocialistiska Partiet, 1940–1963)
Revolutionary Socialist Party (Revolutionära Socialistiska Partiet, 1950–1951)
Communist Labour League of Sweden (Sveriges Kommunistiska Arbetareförbund, 1956–1967)
Communist League Marxist-Leninists/Communist Party of Sweden/Solidarity Party (Kommunistiska Förbundet Marxist-Leninisterna/Sveriges Kommunistiska Parti/Solidaritetspartiet, 1967-199?)
Progress Party (Framstegspartiet, existed in various forms between 1968 and 2000)
Marxist-Leninist Struggle League for the Communist Party of Sweden (m-l) (Marxist-Leninistiska Kampförbundet, 1970–1981)
Centre Democrats (Centrumdemokraterna, 1974–2006)
Communist Unity Groups (Kommunistiska Enhetsgrupperna, 1975–1977)
Communist Workers' League of Sweden (Sveriges Kommunistiska Arbetarförbund, 1977–?)
Communist Party of Sweden (marxist-leninists)/Communist Workers Party of Sweden (Sveriges Kommunistiska Parti (marxist-leninisterna)/Sveriges Kommunistiska Arbetarparti, 1980–1993)
Communist Party in Sweden (Kommunistiska Partiet i Sverige, 1982–1993)
The Marxists (Marxisterna, 1990s)
Workers' List/People's Democrats (sv) (Arbetarlistan/Folkdemokraterna, 1990–2002)
New Democracy (Ny Demokrati, 1991–2000)
Alliance Party (Allianspartiet, 199X–2006)
Natural Law Party (Partiet för naturens lag, 1992–2004)
 (Gottlandspartiet Gotlands framtid, 1993–2006)
New Future (Ny Framtid, 1993–2006)
 (Det nya partiet, 1998)
National Democrats (Nationaldemokraterna, 2001–2014)
Party of the Swedes (Svenskarnas Parti, 2008–2015)
Revolutionary Workers' League of Sweden (Sveriges Revolutionära Arbetarförbund, 1975–1983)
Unique Party (Unika partiet, 2006)
Communist League (Kommunistiska Förbundet, 1980–2010)
Liquor Party (Spritpartiet, 2009–2010)
Socialist Party (Socialistiska Partiet, 1971–present) - As of 2019, the Socialist Party actively encourages its members to vote for the Left Party.
June List (Junilistan, 2004–2014) – Represented in the European Parliament 2004–2009. Did not participate in the 2019 election.

Joke parties
 Donald Duck Party
 Mjölbypartiet

Regional and local parties 

The following is a list of currently active and  defunct (†) parties on the local (municipal and regional) levels. 

Parties that are:
active only at the regional levels are listed in bold
active at both the regional and municipal levels are bold and are marked with an asterisk (*)
simultaneously campaigning on the national level are underlined

Blekinge 

  (Ronnebypartiet, Ronneby)
  (SoL-partiet Sölvesborg och Lister; Sölvesborg)

Dalarna 

 Health Care Party (Sjukvårdspartiet)
 Independent Rural Party (Landsbygdspartiet oberoende, Malung-Sälen and Vansbro)
 Nordic Resistance Movement (Nordiska motståndsrörelsen)

  (Bygdepartiet, Leksand)

 Falu Party (Falupartiet; Falun)
  (Omsorg för Alla; Borlänge)
  (Hedemorapartiet; Hedemora)
 Libertarian Municipal People † (Frihetliga Ljusdalsbygden; Älvdalen)
  (Morapartiet, Mora)
 Municipal List (Kommunlistan, Avesta)
  † (Kommunlistan; Älvdalen)
 Popular Movement for the Good of Borlänge (Folkrörelsen för Borlänges Bästa; Borlänge)

  † (Bopartiet; Ludvika)
  † (Ungdomslistan, Hedemora)

Gävleborg 

 Health Care Party (Sjukvårdspartiet)

  (Folkhemmet i Hofors-Torsåker; Hofors)

Halland 

 Citizens' Coalition* (Medborgerlig samling, Laholm)

  (Laholmspartiet; Laholm)

 Social List Active Politics † (Samhällslistan Aktiv Politik; Falkenberg)

Jämtland 

 Independent Rural Party (Landsbygdspartiet oberoende, Härjedalen)

 Berg Party † (Bergspartiet; Berg)
  (Rättvis Demokrati; Strömsund)
Voice of the People - VOX humana (Folkets röst – VOX humana, Härjedalen)

Jönköping 

 Cooperation in Mullsjö (Samverkan i Mullsjö; Mullsjö)
  (Mullsjös framtid)
  (Solidaritet – Arbete – Fred – Ekologi, Nässjö)

Kalmar 

 Citizens' Coalition* (Medborgerlig samling, Torsås)

 Citizens Party: School - Health Care - Care (Medborgarpartiet: skola – vård – omsorg; Hultsfred)
  † (Livskvalitet i Högsby Kommun, Högsby)
  † (Vimmerbypartiet; Vimmerby)

Kronoberg 

 Independent Rural Party (Landsbygdspartiet oberoende, Uppvidinge)

 The Alternative (Alternativet; Ljungby)
 Alvesta Alternative (Alvesta Alternativet; Alvesta)
  † (Ljungby) 
 Future Party † (Framtidspartiet, Tingsryd)
 Libertarian Municipal People † (Frihetliga Ljusdalsbygden; Ljusdal)

Norrbotten 

 Health Care Party (Sjukvårdspartiet)
 Independent Rural Party (Landsbygdspartiet oberoende, Luleå)

 Socialist Justice Party* (Rättvisepartiet Socialisterna; Luleå)

 Free Democrats of Arjeplog † (Arjeplogs Fria Demokrater; Arjeplog)
  (Fria Norrland; Åre)
 Free Trade Party of Norrbotten (Norrbottens Frihandelsparti, Haparanda)
 Kiruna Party (Kirunapartiet; Kiruna)

Scania 

 Citizens' Coalition* (Medborgerlig samling, Höör)

 Swedish Senior Citizen Interest Party (SPI - Välfärden; Hörby)

 Förnyalund (Renew Lund/For New Lund; Lund)

Södermanland 

 Vård för pengarna (Health care for the money)

Stockholm 
  (Botkyrkapartiet; Botkyrka)
  (Drevvikenpartiet; Huddinge)
  (Öpartiet, Ekerö)
  † (Fritidspartiet; Vallentuna)
  (Lidingöpartiet; Lidingö)
 Stockholm Party (Stockholmspartiet; Stockholm)

Uppsala 

 Health Care Party (Sjukvårdspartiet)

  † (Stoppa E4 Väst – Kulturpartiet; Uppsala)

Västerbotten 

  (Åselepartiet, Åsele)

Västernorrland 

 Health Care Party (Sjukvårdspartiet)

Västra Götaland 

 Democrats* (Demokraterna; Gothenburg)
 Independent Rural Party (Landsbygdspartiet oberoende, Svenljunga)

  † (Vägvalet; Borås)
  (Uddevallapartiet; Uddevalla)

Örebro 

 Independent Rural Party (Landsbygdspartiet oberoende, Askersund, Lindesberg and Nora)

 Örebro Party* (Örebropartiet, Örebro)

Östergötland 

 Independent Rural Party (Landsbygdspartiet oberoende, Kinda, Valdemarsvik and Söderköping)

See also 
 Alliance (Sweden) - centre-right liberal-conservative political party alliances
 County councils of Sweden
 European Parliament
 European Union
 Red-Greens (Sweden) - centre-left to left-wing political party alliances
 Liberalism and centrism in Sweden
 List of ruling political parties by country
 List of Swedish politicians
 Municipalities of Sweden
 Politics of Sweden

Notes

References

External links 

 NSD: European Election Database – Political parties of Sweden

Sweden
 
Sweden politics-related lists
Sweden
Political parties